Tomiyasu is a Japanese surname. Notable people with the surname include:

Kiyo Tomiyasu (born 1919), American engineer who established the IEEE Kiyo Tomiyasu Award
Takehiro Tomiyasu (born 1998), Japanese football player

Japanese-language surnames